Prorocorypha is a genus of slant-faced grasshoppers in the family Acrididae. There is one described species: P. snowi.

References

Further reading

 
 
 

Acrididae
Articles created by Qbugbot
Monotypic Orthoptera genera